The Palazzo Zorzi Galeoni or Palazzo Zorzi a Rio San Severo is a Renaissance style palace of the Zorzi family (also spelled Giorgi)in the Sestiere of Castello, number 4930, in central Venice, Italy; it was designed after 1480 by Mauro Codussi. It lies a few streets away from Santa Maria Formosa, also designed by Codussi. There are a number of Zorzi palaces in Venice, including the Palazzo Zorzi Liassidi and Palazzo Zorzi Bon.

The Zorzi Galeoni in 2018 houses the offices of UNESCO in Venice. The United Nations Educational, Scientific and Cultural Organization. It seeks to build peace through international cooperation in Education, the Sciences and Culture.

Gallery

References

External links
Angela Loredan Zorzi

Zorzi Galeoni
Renaissance architecture in Venice